Alpha Chi National College Honor Society (or ) is an American collegiate honor society recognizing achievements in general scholarship.It was formed in 1922 by nineteen schools in the state of Texas; however, the first official meeting to discuss the founding of an intercollegiate honor society, held on February 22, 1922, only saw five schools represented. Since then it has expanded to 300 chapters throughout the United States.  It is an open society that invites university juniors, seniors and graduate students who are in the top 10 percent of their class into its ranks.

History
In 1915, Southwestern University President Charles M. Bishop created an honor society to encourage and promote superior students.  Faculty at Southwestern reached out to four other colleges and universities in Texas to create an intercollegiate honor society.  On February 22, 1922, the Scholarship Societies of Texas was formed.  A year later, representatives from 13 schools met on the campus of the University of Texas at Austin and six other schools mailed in votes to establish the organization's first constitution.  These 19 schools went on to establish their own chapters of the organization including the Nolle Scholarship Society at Southwest Texas State Normal College, now known as Texas State University–San Marcos.  Between 1926 and 1927 the honor society expanded to schools in Arkansas and Louisiana resulting in the name changing to the Scholarship Societies of the South.  Dean Alfred H. Nolle, after whom Southwest Texas' chapter was named, became President of the newly named organization; Nolle would later serve as the secretary-treasurer for nearly 50 years.  With plans for further expansion, in 1934 the organization voted to change its name again, this time to Alpha Chi.  The name was chosen such that its initials AX would come from the Greek words aletheia for truth and χαρακτήρ for character.

At the 2007 National Convention, a membership category for graduate students was created allowing them, as well as college juniors and seniors, to join the society.  Its current headquarters is located in Little Rock, Arkansas.

Membership
The Alpha Chi Honor Society is open to college juniors, seniors and graduate students who are in the top 10% of their class.  Invitations to join the organization are issued directly to eligible students by faculty advisors of active Alpha Chi chapters.  The society inducts about 10,000 new members each year through its 300 currently active chapters.

Alpha Chi provides a lifetime membership for a one-time fee of $55. Some chapters add the cost of local dues to fund events and subsidize convention participation.

Awards
The national headquarters for Alpha Chi sponsors 43 scholarships and fellowships to members, totaling  each year.  Undergraduate students can receive the Gaston/Nolle Scholarship to help fund their senior year of college.  Undergraduate students who will be attending their first year of graduate school can compete for the Sledge/Benedict Fellowship.  Other active members who are currently, or will be, a graduate student can earn the Pryor/Organ/Freeman Fellowship. Alpha Chi's regions offer scholarships, and individual collegiate chapters may also offer their own scholarships.

References

External links
 
  ACHS Alpha Chi entry

Association of College Honor Societies
Student organizations established in 1922
1922 establishments in Texas
Honor societies